The  San Francisco 49ers season was the franchise's 57th season in the National Football League.

The team entered their 2003 season attempting to improve upon their 10–6 output from the previous year.
This was the first season under head coach Dennis Erickson, whose hiring was highly controversial due to the way the coaching change was handled. The 49ers failed to surpass their 2002 record and finished the season 7–9 by losing six close games.

It was the final season that noted 49ers Terrell Owens, Garrison Hearst, Tai Streets, Ron Stone, and Jeff Garcia spent with the team.

Offseason

NFL Draft

Personnel

Staff

Roster

Regular season

Schedule

Week 1: vs. Chicago Bears 

The 49ers started the season off strongly, defeating the Bears 49–7. The game was close in the second quarter, with the 49ers leading 10–7, however, the Bears' defense gave way to the 49ers' offense who scored 39 unanswered points. The Bears were also plagued with turnovers; the team lost two fumbles and quarterback Kordell Stewart tossed three interceptions. The 49ers’ offensive line performed exceptionally well, as quarterback Jeff Garcia was never sacked during the course of the game.

Week 2: at St. Louis Rams 

Coming off of a blowout, the 49ers played a tight match against the division rivals St. Louis Rams. It was a back-and-forth game, with the lead changing hands four times. The 49ers scored a game-tying touchdown late in the fourth quarter with a pass to Terrell Owens. In overtime, the Rams' Jeff Wilkins kicked a  field goal to win the game, the team overcoming their four turnovers. The loss meant the 49ers started the season 1–1.

Week 3: vs. Cleveland Browns 

In a low-scoring contest, the 49ers lost in a squeaker. After a scoreless first quarter, the 49ers struck first, however, they could not get into the end zone, scoring only four field goals. However, it appeared it would be sufficient; the 49ers led 12–0 in the final quarter. This would not be the case, though, as Browns’ quarterback Kelly Holcomb went on to throw two touchdown passes. Losing dropped the 49ers to 1–2.

Week 4: at Minnesota Vikings 

Playing against the undefeated Vikings, the 49ers were unable to keep pace with their opponent. Scoring only in the final minutes of the fourth quarter, the 49ers were, at one point, behind 35–0. Several times the 49ers came within striking distance, however, three interceptions sealed their fate. The 49ers lost their third consecutive game and fell to 1–3.

Week 5: vs. Detroit Lions 

Attempting to snap a three-game losing streak, the 49ers hosted the Detroit Lions, who were led by former head coach Steve Mariucci. A game riddled with errors, the 49ers fumbled three times (recovery each time), Jeff Garcia threw an interception, and Joey Harrington tossed two. The Lions never led, with the 49ers opening up a 17–0 lead in the second quarter. With their first win since the season opener, the 49ers moved up to 2–3.

Week 6: at Seattle Seahawks 

For the second time in four games, the 49ers lost by a one-point differential. Playing against the division rival Seahawks, the 49ers fell behind 17–0 before halftime and had to play catch up in the second half. Slowly closing the gap, the 49ers scored 19 straight points to take the lead 19–17. However, the defense was unable to stop the Seahawks' 2-minute drill as Seattle's team drove into field goal range and scored the game-winning field goal off the foot of kicker Josh Brown and on the final drive of the game, Garrison Hearst fumbled the ball away at their own 43-yard-line to seal the loss. With the loss, the 49ers fell to 2–4.

Week 7: vs. Tampa Bay Buccaneers 

Hosting the defending Super Bowl champions, the Tampa Bay Buccaneers, the 49ers got their third win of the season, knocking off the Buccaneers 24–7. The 49ers led the entire game and statistically dominated on both sides of the ball, both scoring often and forcing turnovers. With the victory, the 49ers moved to 3–4 on the season.

Week 8: at Arizona Cardinals 

In an attempt to win their second consecutive game for the first time this season, the 49ers traveled to Arizona to play against their division rival, the Cardinals. The game was close throughout, being tied up in the fourth quarter off a one-yard fumble return for a touchdown. However, it was decided in Arizona's favor in overtime with a  field goal. In that game, kicker Owen Pochman missed two field goals and an extra point, and would be replaced by Todd Peterson for the rest of the season. With the loss, the 49ers instead of improving to .500, they dropped to 3–5.

Week 9: vs. St. Louis Rams 

Playing their second straight game against a division rival, the 49ers hosted the St. Louis Rams. The 49ers kick returner Cedrick Wilson returned the opening kick  for a touchdown and the 49ers would not relinquish their lead. The 49ers offense became potent, opening up a 30–3 lead in the third quarter. The win brought the 49ers up to 4–5 heading into their bye week.

Week 11: vs. Pittsburgh Steelers 

Coming off their bye, the 49ers strung together their second straight victory, this time over the Pittsburgh Steelers. The 49ers shut out the Steelers in the first half, leading 10–0 at halftime. The Steelers offense came together in the second half to put some points on the board, statistically leading the 49ers, however it wasn't enough to close the gap. The 49ers' victory brought them to 5–5.

Week 12: at Green Bay Packers 

After completing their first two-game win streak of the season, the 49ers traveled in Week 12 to their conference rival Green Bay Packers. The Packers dominated on both sides of the ball, leading 17–3 at the half. Despite forcing Brett Favre into throwing three interceptions, the 49ers offense could only manage 192 total yards, a majority coming off the performance of their two star players, Garrison Hearst and Terrell Owens. Losing dropped the 49ers back under .500, at 5–6.

Week 13: at Baltimore Ravens 

The 49ers were dismantled by the Ravens easily, 44–6, with the 49ers limited to only two field goals. The 49ers were plagued with turnovers, quarterback Jeff Garcia throwing four interceptions, one of which was returned  for a touchdown by Ray Lewis. With the loss, the 49ers fell to 5–7, including six losses on the road.

Week 14: vs. Arizona Cardinals 

After an embarrassing loss, the 49ers regrouped to win 50–14 against their division rival Arizona Cardinals. A rare safety was also scored, just after halftime. The defense also performed well, forcing two fumbles. With the win, the 49ers climbed to 6–7 on the season.

Week 15: at Cincinnati Bengals 

A high-scoring shootout, the 49ers were slightly outscored by the Bengals, 41–38. The 49ers topped  of total offense, but surprisingly never led in this close game. This can be partially attributed to their four fumbles, three of which were lost to the Bengals. One fumble was returned  for a touchdown by Bengals' Kevin Hardy. The loss meant the 49ers fell to 6–8. Of the 49ers' season, this was the 13th time in 14 games in which the home team won (including the last 11 games), the home team outscoring the visitor 422–199 so far this season.

Week 16: at Philadelphia Eagles 

Another squeaker, this game marked the sixth time this season the 49ers played a game that was decided three points or less, and the only one of those six in which the 49ers walked away with a victory. The 49ers outgained the Eagles, 414 to 293, and dominated in time of possession, but they failed to put away the Eagles in regulation due largely to three special teams miscues by punter Bill LaFleur: a fumbled hold on a first-quarter field goal attempt, a punt returned 81 yards for a touchdown by Brian Westbrook, and an 8-yard punt that set up an Eagles touchdown. But the 49ers were able to win when kicker Todd Peterson from  out during overtime. With the victory, the 49ers moved up to 7–8.

Week 17: vs. Seattle Seahawks 

The last game of the season, the 49ers hosted division rival Seattle Seahawks. The game was tied at the end of the first quarter and again at halftime, but the 49ers were unable to keep in during the second half, losing 24–17. With the loss, the 49ers clinched a losing season, at 7–9, after winning the division the previous year.

Standings

References

External links
 

San Francisco 49ers seasons
San Francisco 49ers
2003 in San Francisco
San